Rabindra Bharati University is a public research university in Kolkata, India. It was founded on May 8, 1962, under the Rabindra Bharati Act of the Government of West Bengal in 1961, to mark the birth centenary of the poet Rabindranath Tagore. It is located at the Tagore family home, Jorasanko Thakur Bari.

The university offers undergraduate and postgraduate programmes in Performing Arts and Visual Arts under the Faculty of Fine Arts, Humanities, Social Sciences and other subjects under the Faculty of Arts.

The current Vice-Chancellor of the university is Professor Sabyasachi Basu Ray Chaudhury, a noted social scientist and political commentator.

History

Tagore museum

The Jorasanko Thakur Bari is the ancestral home of the Tagore family. The first non-European Nobel laureate Rabindranath Tagore was born here.

Notable alumni

Tathagata Mukherjee, Indian actor and independent filmmaker.
Basabdatta Chatterjee, Indian Actress
Ajoy Chakrabarty, Indian Hindustani classical vocalist
 Sanjit Chakraborty, Indian Philosopher in the Analytic tradition.

Choyon Islam, member of the Parliament
Anirban Bhattacharya, Indian film actor 
Chitresh Das, classical dancer
Swagatalakshmi Das Bengali musician
Anup Ghoshal, Indian playback singer and composer 
Sunil Kothari,  Indian dance historian, scholar and critic
John Felix Raj, Vice-Chancellor
Madhushree, Indian playback singer
Deepa Dasmunsi, the Union Minister of State for Urban Development 
Kherwal Soren, Santhali playwright and editor.
Moniruddin Khan, writer
Subhaprasanna, Indian painter
Moinul Hassan, Member of the parliament of India
Niranjan Goswami, Indian mime artist and stage director, founder of Indian Mime Theatre,
Soumitra Sekhar Dey, Bengali linguist, educationist
Neena Prasad, Indian dancer, founder and principal of Bharthanjali Academy of Indian Dances/
Kaberi Bhaumik, Singer, President of Stuti Art & Entertainment

See also
 Department of Instrumental Music, Rabindra Bharati University
List of universities in India

References

External links

 Rabindra Bharati University Website

 
Universities in Kolkata
Art schools in India
Educational institutions established in 1962
Memorials to Rabindranath Tagore
1962 establishments in West Bengal
Universities established in the 1960s